The 1962 European Rowing Championships were rowing championships held on the Langer See in the East Berlin suburb of Grünau in East Germany; the venue had previously been used for the 1936 Summer Olympics. This edition of the European Rowing Championships was for women only and was held from 17 to 19 August. Eleven countries contested five boat classes (W1x, W2x, W4x+, W4+, W8+). Men would three weeks later meet in Lucerne for the inaugural World Rowing Championships.

German participation
The rowing federations of East and West Germany met in July to discuss how their rowers should be represented. FISA did not recognise East Germany as a country and insisted on one German team per boat class. For women's rowing, the West German rowing federation did not want selection trials to be held and preferred that East German crews attend the event; this reflected the dominance of the East German women. For the men who were to compete at the inaugural World Rowing Championships in Switzerland some weeks later, selection trials were agreed on.

Medal summary – women's events
A Romanian crew was entered for both the coxed four and the coxed quad sculls. They asked the British crew, who had a room in the boat house adjacent to the regatta course, whether they could use their beds between the finals races. Having won bronze in the coxed four, the Romanians were given "Vitamin C" injections by their doctors while using the British accommodation; or so they told their hosts. The Romanian crew went on to win gold in the coxed quad sculls.

Medals table

References

European Rowing Championships
European Rowing Championships
Rowing
Rowing
Rowing
Sports competitions in East Berlin
1960s in Berlin